Autokrator is a French blackened death metal band, formed in 2014.

Biography

In 2015 Autokrator recorded its first album, called Autokrator, first released digitally by the band itself, then on vinyl by Iron Bonehead Productions, on CD by Godz ov War Productions / Third Eye Temple and on tape by Inferna Profundus Records.
Each song of the album deals with a Roman emperor, known for his cruelty.

The band recorded in 2016 its second album, called The Obedience to Authority, released on CD by Krucyator Productions / Godz ov War Productions, on vinyl by Larval Productions and on tape by Signal Rex.
The album is based on Stanley Milgram's experience and book Obedience to Authority: An Experimental View and L. Ron Hubbard's book Brain-Washing inspired by Lavrentiy Beria. The band shares a member with N.K.V.D.

In 2018 Autokrator released its third album called Hammer of the Heretics, with Kevin Paradis on drums.
The album is out on A5 digipack on Krucyator Productions and on tape on Deaf Sparrow.

In 2021, Autokrator released their fourth album called Persecution on Krucyator Productions.

Members
Loïc Fontaine - bass, guitar, samples (2014-)
David Bailey - vocals (2014-)
Kevin Paradis - drums (2016-)

Past members
Oleg I - drums (2014-2015)
Markian Volkov - samples (2014-2015)
Brandon L. Polaris - vocals (2014-2015)
Septimiu Hărşan - drums (2015-2016)

Discography

 Autokrator (2015)
 The Obedience to Authority (2016)
 Hammer of the Heretics (2018)
 Persecution (2021)

External links
 Facebook page
 Bandcamp

References

French death metal musical groups
Musical groups from Paris
Musical groups established in 2014
Heavy metal duos
French musical duos
2014 establishments in France